Benito Juárez is a city in Buenos Aires Province, Argentina. It is the administrative centre for Benito Juárez Partido. The town and its partido are named after former Mexican President Benito Juárez; the name was chosen to make a gesture of friendship between Argentina and Mexico.

Geography
Benito Juárez's main city had a population of 14,279 (INDEC, 2010), which represented a 3% growth since 2001 when the city had a population of 13,868.

Climate
Minimum temperatures below  have been recorded in the winter months. Rainfall occurs throughout the year but more frequently in between the months of October and march.

Orography
Towards the Partido of Tandil is set the Tandilia System, an ancient mountain range and one of the oldest rock formations on Earth. The most known hills are: "San Martín de la Tinta", "Lomadas" and "El Sombrerito". The system is built on two billion year old igneous and metamorphic rock that most likely was a part of the supercontinent Rodinia when its coasts were uplifted during the Paleoproterozoic Era. Layers of stratified sediments built up on this base over a period of hundreds of millions of years. Many of these sediments consist of quartz arenite and claystones containing an abundance of fossils and offer insights into life on Earth after the Cambrian–Ordovician extinction event of 488 million years ago.

Personalities
 Julio Alak, Minister of Justice and Humans Rights of Argentina, ex-CEO of Aerolíneas Argentinas and ex-mayor of La Plata city.
 Juan José Ebarlin, TC Mouras 2012 champion, ACTC 3° category. In 2013 he will pilot in ACTC's 2° category.
 Emiliano Narbaits, world champion of Pelota-Paleta Pamplona 2012.
 Andres Perco, sports journalist specialized in motor racing. He used to work in (Tyc Sports).
 Carlos Mosse, Vice Minister of Economy of Argentina (2003-2007)
 Atilio Marinelli (5 de mayo de 1933 - 24 de julio de 1978), famous movie and television actor during the decades of 1950, 1960, and 1970. His work and fame are not only remembered in Argentina, he used to work in México during the first years of 1970. He died of lung cancer in the city of Buenos Aires on July 24 of 1978 at the age of 45 years.

External links

 Benito Juárez website

Populated places in Buenos Aires Province
Cities in Argentina
Argentina